D.505 is a , two-lane state road on the Karaburun Peninsula in western Turkey. The route runs from Karaburun at the tip of the peninsula to the intersection with the D300 near Gülbahçe. Traffic on the D505 is heavy during holidays, especially in the summer, due to the many vacation homes that are situated along the route.

References

505
Transport in İzmir Province